WKTA (1330 AM) is a radio station  broadcasting a multicultural ethnic format. Licensed to Evanston, Illinois, United States, the station serves the Chicago area. The station is currently owned by Polnet Communications, Ltd. The transmitter's power is 5,000 watts, and the station covers the city of Chicago and the Northern suburbs.

FM translator
In addition to the main signal on 1330 kHz, the WKTA signal is also heard on 95.9 MHz, an FM translator.

History
The station began broadcasting in 1953, holding the call sign WEAW. The station was owned by North Shore Broadcasting, and the station's call sign stood for its president Edward A. Wheeler. The station's transmitter was located in Evanston and it ran 500 watts during daytime hours only. In 1956, the station's power was increased to 1,000 watts. By 1959, the station had begun airing brokered ethnic programming. In 1962, the station's transmitter was moved to an unincorporated area between Northbrook and Wheeling, and its power was increased to 5,000 watts. By the early 1970s the station primarily aired brokered ethnic and religious programs.

By early 1979 the station had begun airing a Christian contemporary format. On June 1, 1979, the station's call sign was later changed to WPRZ. On July 14, 1979, WPRZ presented the Christian contemporary festival "Alleluia", which featured Chuck Girard. The station was taken off the air in autumn of 1980.

In late 1981, the license was sold to Lee Hague for $125,000. The following year the station was brought back on the air from a new site in the same area, with the WEAW callsign revived. The station aired adult contemporary music and religious programming. By the mid-1980s the station was airing Christian talk and teaching programs and uptempo Christian contemporary music, with a certain amount of secular adult contemporary mixed in. Christian talk and teaching programs heard on WEAW included The Old-Time Gospel Hour with Jerry Falwell, Family Altar with Lester Roloff, and Insight for Living with Chuck Swindoll.

In 1986, the station was sold to Polnet Communications for $1.2 million. The station would air adult contemporary music, along with a large amount of ethnic programming. In October 1987, the station's callsign was changed to WSSY. The station was branded "Sunny 1330".

In 1989, WSSY began to air a hard rock and heavy metal format branded "G-Force", though brokered ethnic and religious programming continued to air mornings and early afternoons. In 1990 the station's call letters were changed to WKTA. By early 1991, "G-Force" had ended, and the station aired brokered ethnic and religious programming. The hard rock and heavy metal format would again appear on WKTA as "Rebel Radio", a brokered format launched by G-Force alumni Scott Davidson. WKTA would become a flagship station for the hard rock network, which was syndicated to other stations in the midwest. New Life Russian Radio broadcast from Northbrook, Illinois on 1330 AM WKTA, featuring call-in shows, international news, and European music.

References

External links
Resonance Radio's website

KTA
Russian-language radio stations in the United States
KTA
Russian-language mass media in the United States
Radio stations established in 1953
1953 establishments in Illinois